Gil Green (born July 29, 1975) is an American music video, commercial, and film director raised in Miami, Florida.

Personal life
Gil attended the Tisch School of the Arts at NYU, at age 19 his thesis music video appeared on music networks such as MTV, BET, and The Box. This launched his career in the music video industry.

Career
Gil has directed more than 150 music videos for multi-platinum artists such as Camila Cabello, John Legend, Alejandro Sanz Pitbull, Chris Brown, Akon, Lil Wayne, Kanye West, Ne-Yo, Austin Mahone, Drake, Usher, Flo Rida, P-Diddy, Timbaland, Natasha Bedingfield, Robin Thicke, Nelly, 50 Cent, Romeo Santos, Matisyahu, Brandy, Snoop Dogg, Busta Rhymes, Sean Paul, T-Pain, Ace Hood, Rick Ross, Wyclef, Common, Trey Songz, Lupe Fiasco, The Roots, French rapper Rohff, Oscar award winners, Three 6 Mafia and Indian Rapper, DIVINE.

Gil has won numerous awards including Source Magazine’s “Video of the Year,” and an MTV VMA for “Best Hip Hop Video” for directing Lil Wayne's “ Lollipop.” He has been nominated in three consecutive years for the BET Awards “Director of the Year,” award (2008, 2009, 2010.) In 2006 Gil Green was invited to teach a two-week long Music Video Directing course in Ghana, the project was sponsored by his alma-mater, NYU, MTV Base and Ghana's Ministry of Tourism.

Music videos

Commercials

References

External links
 Gil Green's official website
 The Green Room official website
 Gil Green's profile on IMVDb

Living people
American music video directors
1975 births